KTAJ-TV (channel 16) is a religious television station licensed to St. Joseph, Missouri, United States, serving the St. Joseph and Kansas City markets as an owned-and-operated station of the Trinity Broadcasting Network (TBN). The station's studios are located in the Tiffany Springs area of Kansas City, and its transmitter is located at the intersection of East 23rd Street and Topping Avenue in the city's Blue Valley section.

Although KTAJ-TV mainly serves the Kansas City area, it is officially assigned by Nielsen to the St. Joseph market due to the location of its city of license. The station has been available on cable television providers in both the St. Joseph and Kansas City markets since its sign-on, although Charter Spectrum (in the immediate Kansas City area), Comcast Xfinity, Consolidated Communications, AT&T U-verse and Google Fiber do not carry KTAJ but do carry TBN's national feed. Despite St. Joseph being KTAJ-TV's city of license, the station maintains no physical presence there.

Overview
The station first signed on the air on October 15, 1986, and was built and signed on by All American Television, as an affiliate of the Trinity Broadcasting Network. In 2000, KTAJ was purchased by TBN, along with the other All American Television stations. KTAJ is the only full-powered TBN station in the state of Missouri, and was one of only two stations licensed to St. Joseph—alongside ABC affiliate KQTV (channel 2)—until the June 2012 sign-on of Fox affiliate KNPN-LD (channel 26) – although KQTV remains the only local full-power commercial television station licensed to the city (two other low-powered stations owned by KNPN parent News-Press & Gazette Company have signed on since that point – low-powered KBJO-LD (now KNPG-LD; channel 21) and KNPG-LD (now KCJO-LD; channel 30)).

As KTAJ-TV's virtual digital channel is mapped as "16" (its former analog channel assignment) through PSIP, NBC affiliate KNPG-LD instead maps its PSIP channel as virtual channel 21 to avoid co-channel mapping issues with KTAJ.

Local programming
Locally produced programs that are taped in the station's Kansas City studios include local versions of TBN's flagship program Praise the Lord and Joy in Our Town, a public affairs program format that is produced by TBN partner stations on a local basis.

Subchannels

References

External links

Trinity Broadcasting Network affiliates
Television channels and stations established in 1986
1986 establishments in Missouri
Television stations in the Kansas City metropolitan area
TAJ-TV